ECR may refer to:

Associations 
 Efficient Consumer Response, a trade and industry body 
 US Institute for Environmental Conflict Resolution
 European Conservatives and Reformists Party, a European political party
 European Conservatives and Reformists, the affiliated European Parliament group

Radio 
 East Coast Radio (South Africa), a South African radio station (FM 94-95)
 East Coast Radio (Ireland), an Irish radio station

Transportation 
Roads:
 East Coast Road, a scenic beachway along the Coromandel coast of South India
 East Cross Route in London
 El Camino Real (California), an old Spanish road in California
Railways
 East Croydon station, a railway station and tram stop in Croydon, England
 Euro Cargo Rail, rail freight operator based in France
 East Central Railway zone, part of the Indian rail network
 East Coast Rail, Australian rail freight operator
 Eastern Counties Railway, defunct British railway company

Science and technology 
 Electron cyclotron resonance, a phenomenon in physics
 European Congress of Radiology

Engineering 
 Electrical contact resistance, the surface-structure-dependent resistance at a contact interface
 Engineering Change Request, a request for a change in the specification(s) - see Change request or Engineering change order

Other 
 Early Career Researcher
 ECR Engines, the engine-building division of Richard Childress Racing
 Ed Carpenter Racing, an American racing team in the IndyCar Series
 Electronic Cash Register
 Engine control room, shipbuilding abbreviation